Cuhureștii de Jos is a commune in Florești District, Moldova, near the border with Ukraine. It is composed of two villages, Cuhureștii de Jos and Țipordei.

Notable people
 Iustin Frățiman

References

Communes of Florești District